The Klimov M-105 was a V12 liquid-cooled piston aircraft engine used by Soviet aircraft during World War II.

Development
The M-105, designed in 1940, drew heavily on Klimov's experience with the Hispano-Suiza 12Y (license-built as the M-100). In addition to a two-speed supercharger, the M-105 had several improvements like two intake valves per cylinder and a counterbalanced crankshaft. The M-105 was the first Klimov V-12 engine design to use reverse-flow cylinder heads, forcing the induction system to be placed on the outside of the cylinder banks, with the exhaust system also exiting from the outboard side, with twin sets of "siamesed" exhaust ports adjacent to each other. About 129,000 M-105 and its variants were built.

During the war, Klimov's engines were redesignated from "M" (for "motor," engine) to "VK" for the lead designer's initials.

Variants
 M-105  - First version produced at the end of 1939. Installed on some pre-war fighters.
 M-105P - First mass production engine (1940). Able to accept a motornaya pushka (моторная пушка - motor cannon)-mount autocannon in the "vee" between cylinder banks. Installed on the majority Soviet pre-war fighters - Yak-1, LaGG-1 and several experimental aircraft.
 M-105PA - Improved 1941 version.  
 M-105PF (VK-105PF) - 1942 Modification with significantly increased power output at the expense of decreased high-altitude performance. In spite of Klimov's concerns about decreased service life, the engine was pressed into production at the insistence of Yakovlev, and further exploitation of "PF" version showed this was the right decision. The "PF" was installed on the most numerous versions of "Yak" fighters - Yak-1B, Yak-7B, Yak-9.
 VK-105PF2 & PF3 - (1,300 to 1,360 horsepower (970 to 1,015 kW)) Further increase in power output, which was believed to have exhausted the potential of the M-105 design for greater performance. The "PF2" was installed in the Yak-3 and Yak-9U.
 M-105PD - Engine with 2-stage E-100 turbocharger, experimental high-altitude version, unsuccessful prototype.
 M-105R - Decreased propeller reduction gear ratio for bomber aircraft. Installed on Pe-2, BB-22 (Yak-4) and others.
 M-105RA - M-105PA with decreased propeller reduction gear ratio for bomber aircraft.

Applications
P-39 Airacobra
Arkhangelsky Ar-2
Ikarus S-49
P-40 Kittyhawk
Lavochkin-Gorbunov-Goudkov LaGG-1
Lavochkin-Gorbunov-Goudkov LaGG-3
Mörkö-Morane
Petlyakov Pe-2
Petlyakov Pe-3
Yakovlev Yak-1
Yakovlev Yak-2
Yakovlev Yak-3
Yakovlev Yak-4
Yakovlev Yak-7 
Yakovlev Yak-9 
Yermolayev Yer-2

Specifications (VK-105)

See also

References

Notes

Bibliography

External links

 VK-105 on ram.home.com

M-105
1930s aircraft piston engines
V12 aircraft engines